Denis Šefik (born 20 September 1976) is Serbian water polo player who plays for VK Radnički. He represented the Serbia and Montenegro national team until 2006, Serbian national team until 2008 and since 2010, represents the Montenegrin national team.

National team career
He was a member of the Serbia and Montenegro team at the 2004 Athens Olympics where they won the silver medal and the Serbian team at the 2008 Beijing Olympics where they won bronze.  He competed for the Montenegrin team at the 2012 Summer Olympics, where they came fourth, losing the bronze medal match to Serbia by one point.

Honours

Club
 Crvena Zvezda
LEN Champions League: 2012–13
LEN Super Cup: 2013
 Serbian Championship: 2012–13, 2013–14
 Serbian Cup: 2012–13, 2013–14
 Budva
Montenegrin Championship: 2010–11
Montenegrin Cup: 2008–09, 2010–11
 Jadran Hergec Novi
 Serbia & Montenegro Championship: 2002–03, 2003–04, 2005–06
 Serbia & Montenegro Cup: 2003–04, 2005–06 
Bečej
 Serbia & Montenegro Championship: 1995–96, 1996–97, 1997–98, 1998–99
 Serbia & Montenegro Cup: 1995–96, 1996–97, 1997–98, 1998–99
Partizan
 Serbia & Montenegro Championship: 1994–95
 Serbia & Montenegro Cup: 1992–93, 1993–94, 1994–95

Awards
Serbian and Montenegrin Olympic Committee "Athlete of the Year": 2004
 Best Goalkeeper of 2003 European Championship
 Best Goalkeeper of 2006 European Championship
 Best Goalkeeper of 2008 European Championship
 Best Goalkeeper of 2003 World Championship
Best Goalkeeper of the 2004 Olympic Games in Athens

See also
 Serbia and Montenegro men's Olympic water polo team records and statistics
 Serbia men's Olympic water polo team records and statistics
 Montenegro men's Olympic water polo team records and statistics
 List of Olympic medalists in water polo (men)
 List of men's Olympic water polo tournament goalkeepers
 List of world champions in men's water polo
 List of World Aquatics Championships medalists in water polo

References

External links
 

1976 births
Living people
Sportspeople from Belgrade
Serbia and Montenegro male water polo players
Serbian male water polo players
Montenegrin male water polo players
Water polo goalkeepers
Water polo players at the 2004 Summer Olympics
Water polo players at the 2008 Summer Olympics
Water polo players at the 2012 Summer Olympics
Medalists at the 2004 Summer Olympics
Medalists at the 2008 Summer Olympics
Olympic water polo players of Serbia and Montenegro
Olympic silver medalists for Serbia and Montenegro
Olympic bronze medalists for Serbia in water polo
Olympic water polo players of Montenegro
World Aquatics Championships medalists in water polo
European champions for Serbia and Montenegro
European champions for Serbia

Ethnikos Piraeus Water Polo Club players